Phyllonorycter mespilella is a moth of the family Gracillariidae. It is found from Germany to the Iberian Peninsula, Sardinia, Italy and the Carpathian Mountains and from Ireland to southern Russia. It also occurs over much of western North America, from California north to British Columbia, and east to Utah and New Mexico.

The wingspan is 6–8 mm. Adults are on wing in May and again in August.

The larvae feed on Amelanchier ovalis, Cotoneaster integerrimus, Crataegus, Cydonia oblonga, Malus domestica, Mespilus germanica, Prunus cerasus, Pyrus communis, Sorbus aria, Sorbus aucuparia, Sorbus intermedia and Sorbus torminalis. They mine the leaves of their host plant. They create a lower-surface, yellow-green tentiform mine. It has a number of fine folds in the lower epidermis. Mostly, the mine is elongate and situated between two lateral veins. Pupation takes place in a reddish to chestnut brown pupa, made in a cocoon without any frass incorporated. The frass is deposited in a row of loose grains behind the cocoon.

References

mespilella
Moths described in 1805
Moths of Europe
Moths of North America
Taxa named by Jacob Hübner